Columbus Municipal Airport  is a public use airport located one nautical mile (2 km) southwest of the central business district of Columbus, a city in Burke County, North Dakota, United States. It is owned by the Columbus Airport Authority.

Facilities and aircraft 
Columbus Municipal Airport covers an area of 97 acres (39 ha) at an elevation of 1,930 feet (588 m) above mean sea level. It has one runway designated 7/25 with a turf surface measuring 2,560 by 100 feet (780 x 30 m).

For the 12-month period ending September 21, 2012, the airport had 120 aircraft operations, an average of 10 per month: 83% general aviation and 17% air taxi.

See also 
 List of airports in North Dakota

References

External links 
 Columbus Municipal (D49) at North Dakota Aeronautics Commission airport directory
 Aerial image as of June 1995 from USGS The National Map
 

Airports in North Dakota
Buildings and structures in Burke County, North Dakota
Transportation in Burke County, North Dakota